This is a list of Ji Gong (TV series) episodes. Ji Gong series is directed by Zhang Ge, and starring You Benchang and Lü Liang as the "Mad Monk" Ji Gong, a popular Chinese folklore figure from the Southern Song Dynasty. The series originally aired in 1 episode daily on Shanghai Television and Hangzhou Television in 1985.

Episodes

References

Lists of Chinese drama television series episodes
Television episodes set in China